The 1949 Baltimore Elite Giants baseball team represented the Baltimore Elite Giants in the Negro American League (NAL) during the 1949 baseball season. The team won the NAL pennant. Hoss Walker and Lennie Pearson were the team's managers. The team's owner, Vernon Green, died of a heart attack in late May 1949. The team played its home games at Bugle Field in Baltimore. 

Players included 
 Harry Bayliss
 Joe Black
 Pee Wee Butts
 Bill Byrd
 John Davidson
 Butch Davis
 Leon Day
 Leroy Ferrell
 Junior Gilliam
 Vic Harris
 Johnny Hayes
 Henry Kimbro
 Lester Lockett
 Lennie Pearson
 Frazier Robinson
 Sylvester Rogers
 Bob Romby
 Frank Russell
 Hoss Walker
 Alfred Wilmore

References

1949 in sports in Maryland
Negro league baseball seasons